The Southern Tier Spitfire were a team of the Women's Football Alliance which began play in 2010.  Based in Binghamton, New York, the Spitfire played their home games at Alumni Stadium during their one and only season of existence in 2010.  The 2010 Spitfire roster consisted of some players formerly of the Binghamton Tiger Cats who left a few months after the Tiger Cats joined the Independent Women's Football League.
For 2011 only 4 former Tiger Cats are still involved with the Spitfire organization. The Spitfire announced in January 2011 that they will not be fielding a team for the 2011 season and are defunct and no longer exist.

Season-By-Season

|-
|2010 || 0 || 8 || 0 || 3rd National Northeast || 
|-
!Totals || 0 || 8 || 0
|colspan="2"|

* = Current Standing

Roster

Season schedules

2010

** = Forfeited

2011

External links 
 

Defunct American football teams in New York (state)
Women's Football Alliance teams
Sports in Binghamton, New York
American football teams established in 2010
American football teams disestablished in 2011
2010 establishments in New York (state)
2011 disestablishments in New York (state)
Women's sports in New York (state)